Hatsu-Koi is the debut album from Space Streakings, released in 1993 through NUX Organization.

Track listing

Personnel 
Adapted from 7-Toku liner notes.

Space Streakings
 Captain Insect – bass guitar, vocals, programming
 Kame Bazooka – alto saxophone, vocals, horns, illustrations
 Karate Condor – turntables, vocals
 Screaming Stomach – guitar, vocals, trumpet, kazoo

Production
 KK Null – production
 Space Streakings – production

Release history

References

External links 
 Hatsu-Koi at Discogs (list of releases)

1993 debut albums
Space Streakings albums